Applied probability is the application of probability theory to statistical problems and other scientific and engineering domains.

Scope
Much research involving probability is done under the auspices of applied probability. However, while such research is motivated (to some degree) by applied problems, it is usually the mathematical aspects of the problems that are of most interest to researchers (as is typical of applied mathematics in general).

Applied probabilists are particularly concerned with the application of stochastic processes, and probability more generally, to the natural, applied and social sciences, including biology, physics (including astronomy), chemistry, medicine, computer science and information technology, and economics.

Another area of interest is in engineering: particularly in areas of uncertainty, risk management, probabilistic design, and Quality assurance.

History
Having initially been defined at a symposium of the American Mathematical Society in the later 1950s, the term "applied probability" was popularized by Maurice Bartlett through the name of a Methuen monograph series he edited, Applied Probability and Statistics. The area did not have an established outlet until 1964, when the Journal of Applied Probability came into existence through the efforts of Joe Gani.

See also

Areas of application:
Ruin theory
Statistical physics
Stoichiometry and modelling chemical reactions
Ecology, particularly population modelling
Evolutionary biology
Optimization in computer science
Telecommunications
Options pricing in economics
Ewens's sampling formula in population genetics
Operations research
Gaming mathematics
Stochastic processes:
Markov chain
Poisson process
Brownian motion and other diffusion processes
Queueing theory
Renewal theory
 Additional information and resources
Applied Probability Trust
INFORMS Institute for Operations Research and the Management Sciences

References

Further reading

Baeza-Yates, R. (2005) Recent advances in applied probability, Springer. 
Blake, I.F. (1981) Introduction to Applied Probability, Wiley.

External links
 The Applied Probability Trust.